There are several monarchies in Asia, while some states function as absolute monarchies where the king has complete authority over the state, others are constitutional monarchies where a monarch exercises authority in accordance with a constitution and is not alone in decision making.

National monarchies

Constituent monarchies

United Arab Emirates
The United Arab Emirates consists of seven emirates that are all ruled by absolute monarchs. The President of the United Arab Emirates is an office held by the Ruler of Abu Dhabi and the office of Prime Minister is held by the Ruler of Dubai.  The seven Emirates of the UAE are:

 Emirate of Abu Dhabi
 Emirate of Ajman
 Emirate of Dubai
 Emirate of Fujairah
 Emirate of Ras al-Khaimah
 Emirate of Sharjah
 Emirate of Umm al-Quwain

Gallery

Note: Sheikh Humaid bin Rashid Al Nuaimi of Ajman, Saud bin Rashid Al Mu'alla of Umm al-Quwain, Saud bin Saqr Al-Qasimi of Ras al-Khaimah, and Hamad bin Mohammed Al Sharqi of Fujairah are not pictured.

Malaysia
Malaysia, where the Yang di-Pertuan Agong (Supreme Head of State) is elected to a five-year term. Nine hereditary rulers from the Malay States form a Council of Rulers who will determine the next Agong via a secret ballot. The position has to date, been de facto rotated through the State rulers, originally based on seniority. The nine Malay States are the;
 Negeri Sembilan
 Perlis Indera Kayangan
 Sultanate of Selangor
 Sultanate of Terengganu
 Sultanate of Kedah
 Sultanate of Kelantan
 Sultanate of Pahang
 Sultanate of Johor
 Sultanate of Perak

The monarchy of Negeri Sembilan is itself elective.

Other subnational

India and Pakistan

The British ruled Indian Empire became independent from British rule in 1947 and became the Dominion of India and the Dominion of Pakistan and in 1950 India became the Republic of India, in 1956 Pakistan became the Islamic Republic of Pakistan, and in 1971 the province of East Pakistan separated from Pakistan to become Bangladesh. Princely states were only in the present-day countries of India and Pakistan, and not Bangladesh. The princely states who were vassal states of the British, had a certain degree of power and autonomy during the British Raj. The princely states had integrated into the newly independent India and Pakistan between 1947–1975 (the majority of states ascended into India or Pakistan in 1948) and the former monarchs of the princely states who joined before 1971 in India and before 1972 in Pakistan became titular rulers that received a privy purse and initially retained their statuses, privileges, and autonomy. During this time, the former princely states in India were merged into unions, each of which was headed by a former ruling prince with the title of Rajpramukh (ruling chief), equivalent to a state governor.

In 1956, the position of Rajpramukh was abolished and the federations dissolved, the former principalities becoming part of Indian states. The states which acceded to Pakistan retained their status until the promulgation of a new constitution in 1956, when most became part of the province of West Pakistan; a few of the former states retained their autonomy until 1969 when they were fully integrated into Pakistan. The Indian Government formally derecognised the princely families in 1971, followed by the Pakistani Government in 1972, in which their titles, autonomy, and privy purses were take away. Presently the rulers of the former princely states are pretenders who carry out ceremonial roles.

List of Princely States

Indonesia

Indonesia is a republic, however several provinces or regencies preserves their own monarchy, although only Special Region of Yogyakarta that retain actual administrative authority, the rest only holds cultural significance.
 Sultanate of Yogyakarta, Special Region of Yogyakarta in Indonesia
 Pakualaman, a princely state in Special Region of Yogyakarta in Indonesia
 Surakarta Sunanate, Surakarta, Central Java
 Mangkunegaran, a princely state in Surakarta, Central Java
 Keraton Kasepuhan, Cirebon, West Java
 Keraton Kanoman, Cirebon, West Java
 Keraton Keprabonan, Cirebon, West Java
 Keraton Kacirebonan, Cirebon, West Java
 Sultanate of Riau-Lingga, Riau Islands
 Sultanate of Siak Sri Indrapura, Riau
 Sultanate of Deli, Medan, North Sumatra
 Pontianak Sultanate, Pontianak, West Kalimantan
 Sultanate of Banjar, Banjarmasin, South Kalimantan
 Kutai Sultanate, Kutai Kartanegara, East Kalimantan
 Bima Sultanate, Bima, Sumbawa Island, West Nusa Tenggara
 Ternate Sultanate, North Maluku

Philippines
Although the Philippines is a republic, the Southern Philippines have retained their monarchical traditions and are protected under the Indigenous Peoples' Rights Act of 1997.

Sultanate of Sulu
Sultanate of Maguindanao

See also
 List of current monarchs
 Monarchies in Europe
 Monarchies in Africa
 Monarchies in the Americas
 Monarchies in Oceania

References

 
Asia